Albert Carré (born Strasbourg 22 June 1852, died Paris 12 December 1938) was a French theatre director, opera director, actor and librettist. He was the nephew of librettist Michel Carré (1821–1872) and cousin of cinema director Michel Carré (1865–1945). His wife was the French soprano Marguerite Carré (1880–1947).

For over 50 years Albert Carré was a central personality in the theatrical and musical life of Paris.

Life and work 

Leaving Alsace for Paris in 1870, Carré studied drama at the Paris Conservatoire, winning a 2nd prize in comedy, and was engaged at the Théâtre du Vaudeville, leading to a successful career as an actor, before becoming co-director of the Vaudeville in Paris and later the Théâtre-Libre and the Comédie-Française.

He left the Vaudeville to become director of the Opéra in Nancy, where he also helped institute a regular season of symphony concerts in the Salle Poirel from 1889.

Carré's main contribution to operatic history was made as director of the Opéra-Comique, a post he held from 1898 to 1914 and then again from 1919 to 1925 (co-director with Émile and Vincent Isola). He worked to raise the musical standards of the Opéra-Comique and was responsible for the premieres of major operas by French composers, commissioning Debussy's Pelléas et Mélisande, Gustave Charpentier's Louise and Dukas's Ariane et Barbe-bleue, and works by Reynaldo Hahn, Alfred Bruneau and Georges Hüe.

Carré was more progressive musically than his predecessor Carvalho, from whom he took over in 1898. He had written a report for government on the management of opera houses in Germany and approached his position at the Opéra-Comique with reforming zeal, introducing many modern practices. André Messager, (a lifelong friend and collaborator on his most important projects) became the 'directeur de la musique' with expanded responsibilities, allowing him an important role in deciding the works to be performed and singers to be hired. He instituted a more rigorous rehearsal schedule and absentee policy. Carré also created subscription series in which subscribers were guaranteed that works would not be repeated in the same season. In 1899 he inaugurated a 'family series', at a lower cost and concentrating on older works from the repertory. His contract stipulated that he keep in the repertory works of composers who had created the opéra-comique genre, and also that he could not foist the older repertory on secondary artists.

He produced the first French performances of several Italian operas, including Tosca (13 October 1903) and Madama Butterfly (28 December 1906), and mounted many other important new productions, including Carmen (8 December 1898). He was responsible for a new production of Le roi malgré lui in 1929 which helped to bring the piece back to the stage.

He wrote vaudevilles, comedies, and opéra-comique libretti, sometimes with Alexandre Bisson (1848–1912).

He retired in 1936 and wrote his memoirs.

Before and during the First World War, Carré also worked for the 'Deuxième Bureau'. This was part of the intelligence service of the French army and was involved in recruiting Alsatians to the French army when the region was still part of Germany.

Works 
 La Basoche, opéra-comique in 3 acts, music by André Messager, (Opéra-comique, 30 May 1890)
 Faust en ménage, fantaisie lyrique in one act, music by Claude Terrasse, (Théâtre de la Potinière, 5 January 1924)
 La montagne enchantée, pièce fantastique by Émile Moreau and Carré, music by André Messager and Xavier Leroux, 1897
 Frétillon, opéra-comique in 3 acts and 4 tableaux with songs by Béranger and book by Albert Carré. (Théâtre municipal de Strasbourg, 5 March 1927)
 Le roi bossu, opéra-comique in one act 17 March 1932. Music by Elsa Barraine

Non-theatre works 
 Les théâtres en Allemagne et en Autriche, 1889
 Les engagés volontaires alsaciens-lorrains pendant la guerre, Flammarion, 1923
 L'Opéra-Comique connu et inconnu, 1925
 Souvenirs de théâtre, Plon, 1950
 .

References

External links 

Albert Carré on data.bnf.fr
Albert Carré on Cinderella stamp

French opera librettists
French opera directors
Opera managers
French male stage actors
Conservatoire de Paris alumni
Administrators of the Comédie-Française
20th-century French dramatists and playwrights
Commandeurs of the Légion d'honneur
Members of the Ligue de la patrie française
Writers from Strasbourg
1852 births
1938 deaths
Burials at Père Lachaise Cemetery
Actors from Strasbourg